Rui is a village in Rahata taluka of Ahmednagar district in the state of Maharashtra of India.  It is mentioned in ShriSaiSachcharitra, a holy book on Saibaba's life.

The village administration is governed by a body of panchayat, that is "Rui Grampanchayat", established on 2 February 1956.

Sandip Wable is now  sarpanch, political head of office.  He is the first sarpanch directly appointed by the people of village through general elections.

Location
Rui is located near Shirdi city and sharing border with Pimpalwadi, Nighoj, Sawali Vihir Bk., Shingave and Kokamthan villages.

Important places
 ShivSai mandir
 Gram Daivat Shri Hanuman temple
 Old Baarav behind Shivsai temple
 Shri datt mandir at Kohaki

Demographics
Population of Rui is 5211. Males are 2696 and Females are 2515.
Most of the population of village is agrarian, directly depend on agriculture and allied activities
Large portion  work at shirdi
Such shop owners, job in shriSaiSansththan, some people work in ganesh cooperative sugar industry.
Sugarcane, wheat, jawar, bajra, soyabean and guava fruit are the major crops of the village.

See also
List of villages in Rahata taluka

References 

Villages in Ahmednagar district